The tufted jay (Cyanocorax dickeyi) is a species of bird in the crow and jay family Corvidae. It is endemic to a small area of the Sierra Madre Occidental of Sinaloa and Durango in Mexico, including the Espinazo del Diablo region.

It is resident in relatively moist, epiphyte-laden subtropical montane forests, especially those with a large component of oaks.

References

tufted jay
Endemic birds of Western Mexico
Natural history of Durango
Natural history of Sinaloa
Birds of the Sierra Madre Occidental
Near threatened fauna of North America
Near threatened biota of Mexico
tufted jay
Taxonomy articles created by Polbot